Christopher Buckley (born 1948) is an American poet.

Buckley was born in Arcata, California. He graduated from St. Mary's College with a BA, San Diego State University with a MA, and University of California, Irvine with an MFA.
He taught at Fresno State University, University of California, Santa Barbara, Murray State University, West Chester University, and University of California, Riverside.

He married painter Nadya Brown.

Awards
2007 Guggenheim Fellowship
 Fulbright Award in Creative Writing 
 four Pushcart Prizes
 2001 and 1984 NEA grants in poetry

Works
"Sky", UPNE
Blue autumn: poems, Copper Beech Press, 1990, 
Dark matter: poems, Copper Beech Press, 1993, 
Star Apocrypha, Northwestern University Press, 2001, 
Greatest hits, 1978-2000, Pudding House Publications, 2001, 
And the sea: poems, Sheep Meadow Press, 2006, 
Sleepwalk: California dreamin' and a last dance with the '60s, Eastern Washington University Press, 2006
Modern history: prose poems 1987-2007, Tupelo Press, 2008, 
Rolling the Bones: poems, UT Press, 2009, 
One for the Money: The Sentence as a Poetic Form, A Poetry Workshop Handbook and Anthology., Lynx House Press, 2012,

Memoir
Cruising state: growing up in southern California, University of Nevada Press, 1994,

Editor

Naming the Lost: The Fresno Poets (Interviews & Essays. edited by Christopher Buckley (Stephen F. Austin University Press, 2021) 

Condition of the Spirit - The Life and Work of Larry Levis. edited by Christopher Buckley & Alexander Long (Eastern Washington University, 2004) 

How much earth: the Fresno poets, Editors Christopher Buckley, David Oliveira, M. L. Williams, Heyday Books, 2001, 

The geography of home: California's poetry of place, Editors Christopher Buckley, Gary Young, Heyday Books, 1999,

References

External links
"Transparent Art: an interview with christopher buckley ", Chattahoochee Review
"Katmandu Ars Poetica", Gulf Coast: A Journal of Literature and Fine Arts
Christopher Buckley's "Note to Gerald Stern Too Long for the Post Card" in Blackbird: an online journal of literature and the arts

1948 births
Living people
People from Arcata, California
20th-century American poets
Saint Mary's College of California alumni
University of California, Irvine alumni
California State University, Fresno faculty
University of California, Santa Barbara faculty
San Diego State University alumni
Murray State University faculty
West Chester University faculty
University of California, Riverside faculty
21st-century American poets